The Falconer's Arm I is the fourth studio album by composer and guitarist Robbie Basho, released in 1967 by Takoma Records.

Track listing

Personnel
Adapted from The Falconer's Arm I liner notes.

Musicians
Robbie Basho – steel-string acoustic guitar, vocals
Susan Graubard – flute (A2)

Production and additional personnel
ED Denson – mastering
Paul Kagan – photography
Dan McCloskey – engineering

Release history

References

External links 
 

1967 albums
Robbie Basho albums
Takoma Records albums